Duke of Gor is an hereditary title in the peerage of Spain, accompanied by the dignity of Grandee, and granted in 1803 by Charles IV to Nicolás Mauricio Álvarez de las Asturias Bohorques, 12th Lord of Gor, 6th Marquess of Trujillos, 5th Count of Torrepalma and field marshal of the Royal Spanish Armies.

Nicolás Mauricio was son of Alonso Diego Álvarez de las Asturias Bohorques y Verdugo, 11th Lord of Gor, 5th Marquess of Trujillos, 4th Count of Torrepalma, and of María Fausta Vélez Ladrón de Guevara y Enríquez, Countess of Canillas de los Torneros de Enríquez.

The title's name refers to the town of Gor in the province of Granada.

List of Dukes de Gor

History of the Dukes of Gor 

 I Duke: Nicolás Mauricio Álvarez de las Asturias Bohorques y Vélez Ladrón de Guevara (b.1741-d.1825), I duke of Gor, VI Marquess of the Trujillos, V, Count of Torrepalma, VII Count of Canillas de los Torneros de Enríquez, was Marshal of the king. 
He married first, María Teresa Péerez de Barradas y Fernández de Henestrosa, with whom he had no male succession, and secondly with María del Carmen Chacón y Carrillo de Albornoz Medrano y Jácome de Lienden. From his second marriage, he had son:

 II Duke: Mariano Nicolás Álvarez de las Asturias Bohorques y Chacón Carrillo de Albornoz y Guevara (b. 1799, d. 1851), II Duke of Gor, VII Marquess of Trujillos, VI count of Torrepalma, VIII count of Canillas de los Torneros de Enríquez, viscount of Caparacena, and of Abusejo.
He married María de la O Jacoba Guiráldez y Cañas, VIII Viscountess of Valoria, daughter of Jaime Guiráldez y Mendoza.  By way of this marriage all the domains and possessions of the Valoria family, including the castle of Olmillos de Sasamón, province of Burgos, and all their fiefs were incorporated into the duchy of Gor. His son succeeded him:

 III Duke: Mauricio Álvarez de las Asturias Bohorques y Guiráldez (b.1819-d.1877), III Duke of Gor, VIII Marquis of the Trujillos, VI count of Torrepalma, IX Count of Canillas de los Torneros de Enríquez. 
He died unmarried, without issue, and was succeeded by his nephew:

 IV Duke: Mauricio Álvarez de las Asturias Bohorques y Ponce de León (b.1864-d.1930), IV Duke of Gor, IX Marquess of Trujillos, Count of Canillas de los Torneros de Enríquez.
He married Rosa de Goyeneche y de la Puente, daughter of the Count of Guaqui and the Marchioness de Villafuerte. He was the first Spaniard to participate in the Olympic Games, competing in 1900 with the foil, sword and saber. His son succeeded him:

 V Duke: Mauricio Álvarez de las Asturias Bohorques y Goyeneche, V Duke of Gor, XI Count of Canillas de los Torneros de Enríquez. 
He married Beatriz de Silva y Mitjans, daughter of Jaime de Silva y Campbell, XV Duke of Lécera and XI Duke of Bournonville. His son succeeded him:

 VI Duke: Mauricio Álvarez de las Asturias Bohorques y Silva, VI Duke of Gor, Viscount of Caparacena. 
He married Isabel Álvarez de Toledo y Urquijo, daughter of Alonso Álvarez de Toledo y Cabeza de Vaca, XI Marquis of Villanueva de Valdueza, XI Viscount of the Armeria.

Library
The first duke, Nicolás Mauricio Álvarez de las Asturias Bohorques, lived in Granada in a palace later renovated by Francisco Giménez, and acquired a library containing 6,000 manuscripts, books and Arabic documents dating from the 14th and 15th century, from the time of the Emirate of Granada. Arevalo was acquainted with American writer Washington Irving, later Minister to Spain (1842 to 1845); Irving stayed with the duke of Gor during his first visit to Spain, in 1829, and used the duke's library for his Chronicles of the Conquest of Granada (1829).

The collection was acquired in 1962 by the multimillionaire banker Bartolomé March, one of General Francisco Franco's financial advisers. The Dukes of Gor's collection, which formed the largest and most important part of March's collection, was catalogued in 1907.

One notable book in the duke's library was a first edition of Gaspar Correia's Lendas da Índia.

References

Lists of Spanish nobility